Brew is a surname. Notable people with the surname include:

 Aled Brew (born 1986), Welsh rugby union player
 Bill Brew (1918–1941), Australian rugby league footballer
 Charlotte Brew, British equestrian
 Chartres Brew (1815–1870), Canadian judge
 Chloe Brew (born 1995), British rower
 Derrick Brew (born 1977), American sprinter
 Dorian Brew (born 1974), American football player
 Francis Brew (cricketer) (1903–1974), Australian cricketer
 Frank Brew (1927–2020), Australian rules footballer
 George G. Brew (1868–1937), member of the Wisconsin State Assembly
 Helen Brew (1922–2013), New Zealand actress, filmmaker and educator
 John Brew (born 1938), Australian businessman
 Josephine Macalister Brew (1904–1957), British educator
 Kate Brew Vaughn (1873–1933), American author and teacher
 Kwesi Brew (1928–2007), Ghanaian poet and diplomat
 Nathan Brew (born 1982), Welsh rugby union player
 Neil Brew (born 1979), New Zealand rugby union player
 Paul Brew (born 1965), British swimmer
 Rama Brew, Ghanaian actress
 Ray Brew (1903–1979), Australian rules footballer and coach
 Robin Brew (born 1962), British swimmer
 Thomkins Brew, Irish resident magistrate

See also